Atranopsis is a genus of ground beetles in the family Carabidae. There are at least two described species in Atranopsis.

Species
These two species belong to the genus Atranopsis:
 Atranopsis bolognai (Casale & Vigna Taglianti, 1984)  (Turkey)
 Atranopsis scheuerni Baehr, 1982  (Syria)

References

Platyninae